Hossein Pour Hamidi (born March 26, 1998) is an Iranian footballer who plays as a goalkeeper for Aluminium Arak in the Persian Gulf Pro League.

Club career

Esteghlal Khuzestan
He made his debut for Esteghlal Khuzestan in first fixtures of 2018–19 Iran Pro League against Machine Sazi.

Honours

Club
Esteghlal Khuzestan
Persian Gulf Pro League (1) : 2015–16

References

Living people
1998 births
Association football goalkeepers
Iranian footballers
Esteghlal Khuzestan F.C. players
Esteghlal F.C. players